National Institute of Business Management may refer to:

 National Institute of Bank Management (Pune), India
 National Institute of Business Management (Sri Lanka)

See also
 National Institute (disambiguation)